The flag of the Abkhaz Autonomous Soviet Socialist Republic was adopted in 1951 by the republic's government. Its primary visual features are identical to those of the flag of the Georgian Soviet Socialist Republic. A later version of the flag includes a gold inscription under the canton of the republic's name.

History 

On 7 January 1935, the Abkhaz ASSR adopted a new constitution. Its flag is described in article 84 of the constitution:

Another version of the constitution, in Russian, describes the inscription as АССР rather than ASSR. On 2 August 1937, the 8th All-Abkhazian Congress of Soviets approved the constitution. Its two original versions, in Abkhaz and Russian, had different descriptions of the flag:

In 1938, the Abkhaz writing system was changed from Cyrillic script to an alphabet based on Georgian scripts. The Abkhaz inscription on the flag was also changed.

After the adoption of a new flag by the government of the Georgian SSR in 1951, it became the national flag of the Abkhaz ASSR by decree of its Supreme Council on 26 April of that year. There were no additional inscriptions on the flag. Its design was reconfirmed in the Regulations on the State Flag of the Abkhaz ASSR (approved on 31 March 1956) and, with changes, on 28 April 1971 and 3 November 1978.

On 3 November 1978, the Abkhaz government changed the first article in the Regulations on the State Flag of the Abkhaz ASSR; under the blue square, "Аҧсны АССР" was inscribed. On 21 July 1981, a decree approved new Regulations on the State Flag of the Abkhaz ASSR. The regulations stipulated the size of the inscription: one line of separated letters, one-tenth of the flag's width. A 29 August 1981 resolution by the Abkhaz Council of Ministers adopted an Instruction on the Application of the Regulations on the State Flag of the Abkhaz ASSR.

Gallery

References 

Abkhaz Autonomous Soviet Socialist Republic